The Broad Seal War was a controversy over the results of the United States congressional elections in New Jersey in 1838.

Following the closely contested elections of 1838, two contingents of the six New Jersey representatives-elect, one composed of Democrats and the other of Whigs, arrived at the House of Representatives on the opening day of the 26th Congress in December 1839, requesting to be seated as members.

While both held commissions bearing the great (broad) seal of the state, only the Whig commissions were legally executed and signed by the Governor of New Jersey, William Pennington: charging their opponents with electoral fraud and facing loss of control of the House, the Democratic Party majority refused to seat five of the six Whigs.

After it was proved that the county clerks in Cumberland and Middlesex counties had suppressed the returns in certain townships that would have given the Democrats the majority, on February 28, 1840, the House officially seated the five Democratic claimants.

Sources

1838 in New Jersey
19th-century controversies in the United States
Electoral fraud in the United States
26th United States Congress
1838 United States House of Representatives elections
Riots and civil disorder in New Jersey
Politics of New Jersey
United States election controversies